The Northern Limestone Alps, also called the Northern Calcareous Alps, are the ranges of the Eastern Alps north of the Central Eastern Alps located in Austria and the adjacent Bavarian lands of southeastern Germany. The distinction from the latter group, where the higher peaks are located, is based on differences in geological composition.

Geography
If viewed on a west–east axis, the Northern Limestone Alps extend from the Rhine valley and the Bregenz Forest in Vorarlberg, Austria in the west extending along the border between the German federal-state of Bavaria and Austrian Tyrol, through Salzburg, Upper Austria, Styria and Lower Austria and finally ending at the Wienerwald at the city-limits of Vienna in the east.

The highest peaks in the Northern Limestone Alps are the Parseierspitze in the Lechtal Alps, and the Hoher Dachstein. Other notable peaks in this range include the Zugspitze,, located on the German-Austrian frontier and listed as the highest peak in Germany.

Alpine Club classification
Ranges of the Northern Limestone Alps according to the Alpine Club classification of the Eastern Alps (from east to west):

See also
 Limestone Alps
 Southern Limestone Alps
 Geography of the Alps

References

External links

 

Mountain ranges of the Alps
Mountain ranges of Austria
Mountain ranges of Bavaria

es:Alpes Bávaros